Maa Telugu Talliki (IAST: Mā Telugu Talliki) is the official song of the Indian state of Andhra Pradesh. The Telugu Thalli is portrayed as a symbol of Telugu people. Many schools and government events start with this song.

Background
It was written by Sankarambadi Sundaraachari and sung by Suryakumari for the Telugu film Deena Bandhu (1942) which starred V. Nagayya but was released as a private label by the artist.

Lyrics

Legacy and in popular culture
The song was used in the 1976 film Alludochadu featuring Ramakrishna and Jayasudha. The song was used in 1985 film Bullet featuring Krishnam Raju and Suhasini. It was last used in the 2010 film Leader featuring Rana Daggubati and Richa Gangopadhyay.

See also
 Telugu Thalli

References

External links
 Lyricalbeast.com

Culture of Andhra Pradesh
Telugu-language songs
Patriotic songs
1942 songs
Indian state songs